The Round of 32 for the 2009–10 Libyan Cup consists of the 14 Libyan Premier League clubs, in addition to the 18 who qualified from the previous rounds. The draw was conducted on Thursday, January 7 at LFF headquarters in Tripoli. The dates and times for the matches were decided as follows:

References

1